Anthony William Paul Stenham (28 January 1932 – 22 October 2006), and named "Cob" after Richard Cobden, was a director of Unilever for sixteen years, the chairman of Ajro Wiggins Appleton from 1991 and on the board and latterly chairman of Telewest, for twelve years from 1994 to 2006. He died of a heart attack and was buried on the west side of Highgate Cemetery.

Background and family
Stenham was educated at Eton and Trinity College, Cambridge (law and economics).  His daughters are the playwright, Polly Stenham, and Daisy Stenham.

References

External links
 Obituary The Guardian

1932 births
2006 deaths
Burials at Highgate Cemetery
People educated at Eton College
Alumni of Trinity College, Cambridge
English chief executives
20th-century English businesspeople